Tim Lawrence is a British actor who acted in Bollywood films.

Biography
Lawrence acted in I Proud to Be an Indian which was released in 2004. This film was his debut film in  Bollywood. Later, he acted in Veer which was released in 2010.

Filmography

References

External links
 

Living people
21st-century British male actors
Male actors in Hindi cinema
Year of birth missing (living people)